Omar Khalil (born 8 March 1977) is a former footballer who played as a midfielder.

Born in Syria, Khalil represented his native country at under-20 level, before switching allegiance to Palestine. He made several appearances for the Palestine national team, including a 2006 FIFA World Cup qualifying match against Iraq on 16 November 2004.

References

External links

1977 births
Living people
Sportspeople from Damascus
Syrian people of Palestinian descent
Syrian footballers
Palestinian footballers
Association football midfielders
Syria youth international footballers
Palestine international footballers